Burnside is an unincorporated community located in Neshoba County, Mississippi, United States.

Former post office

From 1905 to 1951, a post office operated in Burnside. Three postmasters served the community during that time.

References

Unincorporated communities in Neshoba County, Mississippi
Unincorporated communities in Mississippi